Hypermastus epiphanes is a species of sea snail, a marine gastropod mollusk in the family Eulimidae.

References

External links

Eulimidae
Gastropods described in 1897